Bombay Spinning and Weaving Company was the first cotton mill to be established in Bombay, India, on 7 July 1854 at Tardeo by Cowaszee Nanabhoy Davar (1815–73) and his associates. The company was designed by Sir William Fairbaim. This mill began production on 7 February 1856 under the supervision of British engineers and skilled cotton operatives.

See also 
Kawasajee Nanabhoy Davar

References

Industry and Innovation By William Henry Chaloner, D. A. Farnie, William Otto Henderson, p. 113
A City Emerges from Hindustan Times

Textile mills in India
Cotton mills
Textile companies based in Maharashtra
Cotton industry in India
Defunct textile companies of India
Defunct companies based in Mumbai
Manufacturing companies based in Mumbai
Defunct manufacturing companies of India
Indian companies established in 1854